Ashish Chaudhary (born 21 July 1978) is an Indian television actor who has acted in many Hindi films and TV shows. He is best known for portraying Boman in the comedy films Dhamaal and Double Dhamaal, winning Fear Factor: Khatron Ke Khiladi 6, participating in Jhalak Dikhhla Jaa 8 and playing Mrityunjay Roy in the romantic thriller TV series Beyhadh 2.

Filmography

Films

Television

Music videos

References

External links

 
 

Living people
20th-century Indian male actors
Indian male models
Male actors in Hindi cinema
21st-century Indian male actors
Male actors from Guwahati
1978 births
Fear Factor: Khatron Ke Khiladi participants